Dessau is the second studio album by Dessau, released on November 21, 1995 by Mausoleum.

Music
Dessau contained previously unreleased recordings with material the band had released previously. "Suffer" was released on the WTII Records 2014 Free Sampler and a remix was released on Fifth Colvmn Records' Fascist Communist Revolutionaries compilation prior to Dessaus release. "Bejing" and the band's cover of Joy Division's "Isolation", which had become a minor hits for the band, were previously released on their 1989 studio album Exercise in Tension. "Isolation" was recorded in 1988 and produced by Paul Barker of Revolting Cocks and Al Jourgensen of Ministry. The cover has been released as a 12" single and on three various artists compilations: C'Est La Silenz Qui Fait La Musique... (1994, Electro Pulse), CDPRO Vol #13 (June 1996) (1996, EMI Music Canada) and Down & Dirty (1999, Pet Rock).

Reception

Tim Griggs of AllMusic gave Dessau a negative review, calling the material "tired" and that "most of the tracks are mindless screamfests that don't seem to go anywhere."

Track listing

Personnel
Adapted from the Dessau liner notes.Dessau John Elliott – programming, keyboards, drums, vocals, production (2, 4, 5, 8, 11), mixing (2, 4, 5, 8)
 Mike Orr – vocals (1, 2, 4, 5, 8, 11), guitar (1, 4, 6, 8, 11), bass guitar (2, 5), melodica (6), mixing (4, 8)
 Norm Rau – guitar, percussion, vocals, mixing (4, 8)Additional performers Luc van Acker – loops (12)
 Steve Anderson – guitar (10)
 Brooks – guitar (7)
 Frank Brodlo – bass guitar (12)
 Lynn Green – percussion (3, 9)
 Griff & Hans – Sony Walkman (1)
 Price Harrison – backing vocals (5)
 Barry Nelson – bass guitar (1, 4, 6, 8, 11)
 Skot Nelson – guitar (tracks: 2, 5, 12)
 Matt Swanson – Sony Walkman (1)
 Giles Reaves – percussion (2), recording (4), programming and instruments (5)
 Terry Townson – horn (7)
 Rick Will – instruments (4)Production and design'
 Paul Barker – mixing (1, 6, 7, 10, 12), production (1, 3, 6, 7, 9, 10, 12), recording (1, 3, 7, 9, 10), additional recording (6, 12), programming (3, 10), bass guitar (7, 9), guitar (9)
 Bill Brunt – cover art, design
 Tom Der – recording (2, 5, 12)
 Robb Earls – recording (1, 3, 7, 9, 10), mixing (1, 10)
 Brian Hardin – assisitant mixing (11)
 Steven Jacaruso – art direction, design
 Julian Herzfeld – assisitant mixing (12)
 Mike Griffith – additional recording (3, 9), recording (11)
 Rich Jegens – photography
 Al Jourgensen – production and mixing (6, 12), guitar and programming (6), recording (12)
 Peter Nash – photography
 Jeff "Critter" Newell – assisitant mixing (7)
 Mike Poole – recording (4, 6, 8)
 Giles Reaves – mixing (2-5, 8, 9), production (4, 8)
 Steve Spapperi – additional recording and assistant mixing (6)

Release history

References

External links 
 

1995 albums
Dessau (band) albums
Albums produced by Paul Barker
Albums produced by Al Jourgensen
Albums produced by Giles Reaves